is a Japanese former football player.

Career
After three seasons playing for JEF United Chiba, Masushima retired in December 2020.

National team career
In June 2005, Masushima was selected Japan U-20 national team for 2005 World Youth Championship. At this tournament, he played all 4 matches as center back.

Personal life
Masushima married badminton player Reiko Shiota on September 30, 2012.

Club statistics

1Includes AFC Champions League.
2Includes FIFA Club World Cup, Japanese Super Cup and Suruga Bank Championship.

National team statistics

Appearances in major competitions

Honours
 FC Tokyo
 J.League Cup (1): 2004

 Kashiwa Reysol
 J1 League (1): 2011
 Emperor's Cup (1): 2012
 Japanese Super Cup (1): 2012
 J.League Cup (1): 2013
 Suruga Bank Championship (1): 2014

References

External links

at Kashiwa Reysol

1985 births
Living people
Association football people from Chiba Prefecture
Japanese footballers
Japan youth international footballers
J1 League players
FC Tokyo players
Ventforet Kofu players
Kyoto Sanga FC players
Kashiwa Reysol players
Vegalta Sendai players
JEF United Chiba players
Association football defenders